Marmot Basin is an alpine ski area located on Marmot Mountain in Alberta's Jasper National Park. It has 91 named runs on four mountain faces with 3,000 vertical feet of drop. The area has a lift capacity of close to 12,000 skiers per hour on seven lifts. The season runs from mid-November to early May. It is located twenty minutes south of Jasper and sees two million visitors a year.

Amenities
The Rental & Repair shop offers rentals of skis, snowboards, boots, and poles. The Snow Sports School offers lessons, clinics, and a variety of children's programs.

There are three mountain day lodges: Caribou Chalet at the base area and Eagle and Paradise Chalets at mid-mountain. There is no current overnight on-mountain lodging at Marmot Basin.

Marmot Basin has three terrain parks on the mountain, which feature various rail slides, table tops, and jumps. Marmot offers a terrain park in the Lower, Mid, and Upper Mountains.

Lift system

Former lifts
 Tranquilizer Chair (Double Chair) - 1968 - Removed 2009
 Kiefer T-Bar (T-Bar) - 1974 - Removed 2009
 School House T-Bar (T-Bar) - 1964 - Removed 2011
 Caribou Chair (Double Chair) - 1971 - Retired 2011
 Spillway T-Bar (T-Bar) - 1986 - Removed 1990

Photos

See also
 List of ski areas and resorts in Canada
 Jasper National Park

References

External links
 SkiMarmot

Ski areas and resorts in Alberta
Jasper National Park